New Kid In Town or variation, may refer to:

 "New Kid in Town", 1976 song from The Eagles
 "New Kid in Town", a 2010 single by Dani Harmer. 
 "New Kid in Town", 1994 season 3 episode 22 number 61 of Rugrats. See List of Rugrats episodes.
 "New Kid in Town", 2004 series 1 episode 1 number 1 of Powers.
 "New Kid in Town", 2007 season 1 episode 1 number 1 of Cory in the House, see List of Cory in the House episodes

 "New Kids in Town" (Superman: The Animated Series episode), 1998 season 3 episode 3 number 44 of Superman: The Animated Series
 "New Kids in Town" (2010 song), the 2010 debut single of Belgian pop band School is Cool
 New Kids in Town (1990 film) aka New Killers in Town aka Master of Disaster, a 1990 Hong Kong film starring actress Moon Lee

See also